GongGam (共感 - Cộng Cảm - Empathy), also known as the GongGam Human Rights Law Foundation is the first non-governmental organization in Korea to provide legal services for marginalized communities. It was founded in 2004 as an offshoot of the Beautiful Foundation. Since then GongGam has grown from four to nine lawyers who work in the newly developing area of public interest law. GongGam is financed by mostly grassroots donations.

Activities
GongGam provides legal support and advice to other non-governmental and nonprofit organization on issues relatimg to the protection of human rights and the elimination of discrimination. The organization also provides legal education to NGOs and other public interest groups. GongGam advises and provides representation in various litigations relating to social inequalities. GongGam develops programs for public interest lawyering and coordinates pro bono activities.

Impact on Korean society

Women rights 
2016: GongGam conducted a research on situation of migrant women's work environment in agriculture and the sexual violence against them. It later organized development conferences and legal action.

2015: GongGam represented four Filipino women who came to Korea on an entertainment (E-6-2) visa but ended up being sexually exploited in a foreigners-only club.

Migrants and refugees 
GongGam successfully represented a young Vietnamese woman who was tricked into marrying a Korean man.

Disability rights 
2016: GongGam participated in the public hearing about Article 24 of the Mental Health Act in the Constitutional Court before the Constitutional Court decided that Article 24 was unconstitutional in 2016.

Precarious workers 
2016: 

2014: GongGam represented the family of an apartment security guard who committed suicide following repeated maltreatment by some of the residents.

References

2004 establishments in South Korea
Human rights organizations based in South Korea
Legal organizations based in South Korea
Organizations established in 2004